Oliver Sofus Pettersen Dahl (December 20, 1877 – November 30, 1952) was a Norwegian theater and film actor.

Dahl was born in Horg, Norway, the son of Peder Dahl and Johanna Iversdatter Elgaaen. He was the half-brother of the novelist and playwright Johan Bojer. Dahl married the actress Inga Sparre Dahl, with whom he established a touring ensemble after Ludovica Levy's National Tour (Nationalturneen) closed in 1912. In 1918 they started performing at the new theater in Stavanger, and Dahl was also involved in the start-up of the Trondheim Theater in 1911. Dahl led the new Søilen Theater from 1930 to 1932.

Works
 Teaterminner. Fra Nasjonalturneens dager (Theater Memories. From the Days of the National Tour; 1959), edited by his son Torbjørn Sparre Dahl.

Filmography
 1926: Simen Mustrøens besynderlige opplevelser as Per Pikajord
 1932: Den store barnedåpen
 1933: Jeppe på bjerget as a farmer
 1936: Morderen uten ansikt as Brenne, a detective
 1936: Vi vil oss et land... as Amund Fisker
 1938: Bør Børson Jr. as Bertil, a smallholder
 1939: De vergeløse as Olsen
 1939: Gjest Baardsen as a constable
 1939: En enda natt as Krogh
 1941: Kjærlighet og vennskap as Erik Lind
 1943: Sangen til livet as the prison director
 1949: Svendsen går videre

Radio
 1941: Fridtjof Nansen – en helt fra vår egen tid, radio play for the Norwegian Broadcasting Corporation, as a professor

References

External links 
 

1877 births
1952 deaths
Norwegian male stage actors
Norwegian male film actors
Norwegian male silent film actors
Norwegian theatre directors
20th-century Norwegian male actors
People from Melhus